Patrecia Scott (January 23, 1940 — March 31, 1977) was a Canadian-born model as well as television and stage actress who was married to Nathaniel Branden from 1969 until her death in 1977.

Biography
Born Patrecia Gullison, she started attending, in 1961, talks by psychologist and lecturer on Objectivist philosophy Nathaniel Branden, who was also born in Canada. In 1963 she married fellow student Lawrence Scott but, within months of her marriage, became romantically involved with Branden. The relationship ultimately became one of the key factors in Branden's split with his partner, mentor and lover, Ayn Rand.

Having used the name Patrecia Scott for modeling and acting assignments, she divorced Scott in 1966 and sought Rand's advice regarding a new professional name. Rand suggested that she take the surname of Gail Wynand, one of the lead characters in her novel The Fountainhead. Her new stage name thus became Patrecia Wynand.

In 1968, she and Branden moved to California and married in November 1969. In 1977, she drowned at home due to what was considered to be an epileptic seizure triggered by sunlight reflecting off the water in the pool while feeding their dog.

Filmography (as Patrecia Wynand)
 Khan! 
TV episode title: "Mask of Deceit"
Originally aired 1975

Hawaii Five-O 
TV episode title: "A Woman's Work Is with a Gun" 
Originally aired January 21, 1975
Character name: Fay

Mannix
TV episode title: "A Walk in the Shadows" 
Originally aired 1972
Character name: Linda

The Man and the City
TV episode title: "Jennifer" 
Originally aired 1971 
Character name: Rachel

Do Not Fold, Spindle or Mutilate
ABC Movie of the Week
Originally aired 1971
Character name: Hostess

References

Sources
Branden, Barbara (1986), The Passion of Ayn Rand.
Branden, Nathaniel (1989), Judgment Day.

Known as
Patrecia Scott (first married name and professional name)
Patrecia Branden (second married name)
Patrecia Wynand (stage name)

External links

1940 births
1977 deaths
Canadian film actresses
Canadian stage actresses
Canadian expatriate actresses in the United States
Deaths by drowning in California